Tufted folliculitis presents with doll's hair-like bundling of follicular units, and is seen in a wide range of scarring conditions including chronic staphylococcal infection, chronic lupus erythematosus, lichen planopilaris, Graham-Little syndrome, folliculitis decalvans, acne keloidalis nuchae, immunobullous disorders, and dissecting cellulitis.

See also 
 Cicatricial alopecia
 List of cutaneous conditions

References 

Conditions of the skin appendages